This article list all the confirmed broadcasters for the UEFA Europa Conference League with each broadcaster holding three season broadcasting rights. The first cycle will start in 2021–2024.

Current broadcasters

2021–2024

2024–2027 seasons

References

broadcasters
Lists of sporting event broadcasters